George Pelham (13 October 1766 – 7 February 1827) was a Church of England bishop, serving in the sees of Bristol (1802–1807), Exeter (1807–1820) and Lincoln (1820–1827). He began his career as Vicar of Hellingly in Sussex in 1800.

George Pelham was the third (and youngest) son of Thomas Pelham, 1st Earl of Chichester and his wife Anne Frankland.

He was educated at Westminster and Clare College, Cambridge, graduating in 1787. He also served from 1815 to 1827 as Clerk of the Closet.

His monument, by Edward Hodges Baily, stands on Buckden.

Family

He married Mary Rycroft, daughter of Sir Richard Rycroft, 1st Baronet and Penelope Stonehewer. they had no children.

References

1766 births
1827 deaths
Younger sons of earls
Alumni of Clare College, Cambridge
Bishops of Bristol
Bishops of Exeter
Bishops of Lincoln
19th-century Church of England bishops
Clerks of the Closet
George